Josho Pat Phelan, Buddhist name Taitaku Josho, is a Sōtō Zen priest and current abbot of Chapel Hill Zen Center in Chapel Hill, North Carolina—she has served as abbot there since 2000. Before coming to Chapel Hill, she practiced for twenty years at Tassajara Zen Mountain Center and the San Francisco Zen Center (where she became practice leader and director). Phelan began leading the Chapel Hill Zen Center in 1991, when there were just eight members including herself. As of 2001, the center had forty-five members and provides meditation instruction for approximately one-hundred and fifty people every year. Ordained as a priest by Zentatsu Richard Baker in 1977, she began Zen practice in 1969 and has also trained under Sojun Mel Weitsman, Robert Baker Aitken and Tenshin Reb Anderson Additionally, Phelan is a member of the American Zen Teachers Association, and in 1995 she received shiho from Sojun Weitsman at Tassajara.

See also
Buddhism in the United States
Timeline of Zen Buddhism in the United States

References

External links

San Francisco Zen Center
Soto Zen Buddhists
Zen Buddhist priests
American Zen Buddhists
Living people
Women Buddhist priests
Buddhist abbesses
Year of birth missing (living people)